Wolcott A. "Wooky" Roberts (September 1, 1897August 27, 1951) was a professional American football player during the early years of the National Football League (NFL).  Roberts won two NFL championships with the Canton Bulldogs in 1922 and 1923, one with the Cleveland Bulldogs in 1924, and another with the Frankford Yellow Jackets in 1926.

He played college football for the Navy Midshipmen football team while attending the United States Naval Academy.  After the 1918 season, he was selected as a consensus first-team halfback on the 1918 College Football All-America Team.

Before enrolling at the Naval Academy, Roberts was a student at Colgate University. After completing his service in the Navy, he worked as a structural engineer with the Industrial Power Equipment Company in Philadelphia.  He died at his home in Drexel Hill, Pennsylvania, in August 1951 at age 53.

References

1897 births
1951 deaths
People from Elmwood, Illinois
Canton Bulldogs players
Cleveland Bulldogs players
Frankford Yellow Jackets players
Colgate Raiders football players
Navy Midshipmen football players
Players of American football from Illinois
People from Drexel Hill, Pennsylvania
Military personnel from Pennsylvania
Military personnel from Illinois